Margaritaville at Sea (formerly Bahamas Paradise Cruise Line) is a cruise line that operates two-day voyages out of West Palm Beach, FL to Grand Bahama Island. The company was originally founded as Bahamas Paradise Cruise Line in late 2014, and began operating its first cruises in February 2015 with the now retired Grand Celebration. In May of 2022 the company was rebranded to Margaritaville at Sea following a partnership between Bahamas Paradise Cruise Line and Jimmy Buffet's Margaritaville brand. Their sole ship the Grand Classica was refurbished and renamed the Margaritaville at Sea Paradise. Before the cruise line's rebranding, Margaritaville at Sea was previously a small chain of Margaritaville style restaurants and bars that were included or later added to the newer Norwegian Cruise Line ships starting in 2015 with the Norwegian Escape. The partnership with Norwegian Cruise Line ended in late 2019. The restaurants were later unbranded and converted into other dining venues.

History
Former Celebration Cruise Line executives formed Bahamas Paradise Cruise Line and purchased the Costa Celebration to take over the route formerly operated by the Bahamas Celebration. The cruise line's first cruise was scheduled to depart on February 1, 2015. Due to technical difficulties, the voyage was cancelled. Repairs were made and the ship set sail on February 3.

The company is currently majority-owned by the family of former Norwegian Cruise Line President and CEO Kevin Sheehan. 

On September 19, 2017 FEMA chartered the ship for a 90-day period through December 2017 to house the National Guard in St. Thomas, which was devastated by Hurricane Irma. The ship returned to service on December 23, 2017.

It was announced in December 2017 that the cruise line purchased the former Costa ship neoClassica. It entered service on 13 April 2018 as the Grand Classica.

Beginning in September 2019, Bahamas Paradise Cruise Line began running Humanitarian missions to Grand Bahama Island in the wake of Hurricane Dorian. 

In November 2020, the cruise line sold Grand Celebration to an undisclosed buyer, and in January 2021 she was beached  in Alang for scrapping. 

In September 2021 all cruises were cancelled as Grand Classica was chartered to Entergy in New Orleans to house over 1500 workers restoring power to the area following Hurricane Ida.

Rebranding To Margaritaville at Sea
On December 8th, 2021 Jimmy Buffett's Margaritaville announced the partnership with the cruise line to rebrand it as Margaritaville at Sea while still retaining the same ownership and CEO as before. The last voyage under Bahamas Paradise is scheduled to take place on April 16, 2022. Upon the completion of the final cruise, the Grand Classica will sail to the Grand Bahama Shipyard for a rebranding and refit of the ship's interiors and venues to be themed under the Margaritaville brand. Also during the refit the ship will be renamed the Margaritaville Paradise. It is scheduled to begin sailing for the rebranded line starting April 30th. It will continue to offer 2 day cruises from the Port of Palm Beach to Freeport, Bahamas.

Fleet

References

External links
Margaritaville at Sea Website

Cruise lines
Transport companies established in 2014